Umbul-umbul, also called rérontek or, archaically, tunggul, are a type of flag or pennant made of a strip of cloth whose longer side is attached to a pole. They are used in the traditional culture of Java and Bali, Indonesia, where they are carried in festivals and serve other decorative purposes. Red and white Umbul-umbuls are raised throughout Indonesia along streets in August to commemorate the Indonesian independence day. 

Traditional umbul-umbul in Java and Bali are usually curved, because they are posted on bamboo poles which are flexible thus often swings according to wind blows. Traditional umbul-umbul are akin to Balinese penjor, raised during Galungan festival. Penjor is curved bamboo pole decorated with woven janur, young coconut leaf that is also the material to make ketupat woven pouch. The tip are often decorated with woven janur ornaments. Modern umbul-umbul however, are usually posted upon straight metal flagpoles.

Etymology

A Sundanese language dictionary of 1862 translates the word "umbul-umbul" as "a banner; any signal, as a flag or other object, hoisted so as to be seen at a distance. Banners carried about the person of native chiefs. A small flag attached to a spear." It also notes that the same word, pronounced differently, means "to come in sight, to show up".

See also

Nobori, slightly similar Japanese vertical banner

References

Types of flags
Javanese culture
Balinese culture